Slobomir Televizija is a Bosnian commercial television channel based in Slobomir (near city of Bijeljina), Bosnia and Herzegovina. The program is mainly produced in Serbian. The TV station was established in 2005. The local radio station Radio Slobomir is also part of this company.

External links 
 
 Communications Regulatory Agency of Bosnia and Herzegovina 

Mass media in Bijeljina
Television stations in Bosnia and Herzegovina
Television channels and stations established in 2005